The 2020–21 Hartford Hawks men's basketball team  represented the University of Hartford in the 2020–21 NCAA Division I men's basketball season. They played their home games at the Chase Arena at Reich Family Pavilion in West Hartford, Connecticut and were led by 11th-year head coach John Gallagher. They finished the season 15-9, 8-6 in America East Play to finish in 4th place. They defeated Binghamton, Albany, Vermont, and UMass Lowell to be champions the America East tournament. They received the America East’s automatic bid to the NCAA tournament where they lost in the first round to Baylor.

Previous season
The Hawks finished the 2019–20 season 18–15, 9–7 in America East play to finish in third place. They defeated UMass Lowell and Stony Brook to advance to the championship game of the America East tournament vs Vermont. However, the championship game, and all postseason tournaments, were cancelled amid the COVID-19 pandemic.

Roster

Schedule and results

|-
!colspan=12 style=| Non-conference regular season

|-
!colspan=12 style=| America East tournament
|-

|-
!colspan=12 style=| NCAA tournament

Source

References

Hartford Hawks men's basketball seasons
Hartford Hawks
Hartford
Hartford
Hartford